David Charles Thomas (16 August 193427 August 2013) was a Welsh professional golfer and renowned golf course architect.

Thomas was one of Britain's leading golfers during the 1950s and 1960s with many tournament victories around Europe, including the News of the World Match Play and the Belgian, Dutch and French Open championships. He was runner-up at The Open Championship in 1958 and 1966.

Career
Born in Newcastle upon Tyne, England, Thomas turned professional in 1949, taking up a position as an assistant. He later played tournament golf, and won more than a dozen titles in Britain and around Europe. He also tried his hand in the United States with less success, although he did win a qualifying tournament for the U.S. Open in 1964 and finished second in the St. Paul Open.

In 1958, Thomas finished tied with Peter Thomson after 72 holes in the Open at Royal Lytham, but lost the 36-hole Saturday playoff by four strokes.  At Muirfield in 1966, he again finished as runner-up, one stroke behind Jack Nicklaus. Throughout his career, Thomas was renowned for his long, straight, driving, and once hit a drive during a practice round for the 1967 Open at Hoylake onto the green at the  second hole.

Thomas represented Great Britain in the Ryder Cup on four occasions, in 1959, 1963, 1965 and 1967, only being defeated once in his five singles matches. He also represented Wales in the Canada Cup, which later became the World Cup of Golf, on eleven occasions, and again at the Double Diamond Internationals in 1972.

Thomas was elected Captain of the Professional Golfers' Association during their centenary year in 2001, and in 2006 was recognised for his contribution to golf by being made an honorary life member of the PGA.

After retiring from tournament golf due to back and eye problems, Thomas set up a golf course design business. He designed over 100 courses around the world, and his work includes Hacienda Del Alamo, the Brabazon, Derby and PGA National courses at Ryder Cup venue The Belfry.

Thomas lived his last few years in Marbella, Spain where he died at his home on 27 August 2013.

Professional wins
This list may be incomplete.
1955 Gor-Ray Cup, Belgian Open
1957 Caltex Tournament
1958 Dutch Open, Caltex Tournament
1959 French Open
1961 Esso Golden Tournament (tie with Peter Thomson)
1962 Esso Golden Tournament
1963 News of the World Match Play, Olgiata Trophy (Rome)
1965 Silentnight Tournament (tie with Jimmy Martin)
1966 Esso Golden Tournament, Swallow-Penfold Tournament, Jeyes Tournament
1968 Penfold Tournament
1969 Graham Textiles Champion, Pains Wessex Champion

Playoff record
PGA Tour playoff record (0–1)

Results in major championships

Note: Thomas never played in the PGA Championship.

CUT = missed the half-way cut (3rd round cut in 1969 Open Championship)
"T" indicates a tie for a place

Summary

Most consecutive cuts made – 7 (1956 Open Championship – 1963 Open Championship)
Longest streak of top-10s – 2 (1957 Open Championship – 1958 Open Championship)

Team appearances
Ryder Cup (representing Great Britain): 1959, 1963, 1965, 1967
World Cup (representing Wales): 1957, 1958, 1959, 1960, 1961, 1962, 1963, 1966, 1967, 1969, 1970
R.T.V. International Trophy (representing Wales): 1967
Double Diamond International (representing Wales): 1972, 1973

References

External links
Dave Thomas Limited Golf Course Design Consultants

Welsh male golfers
European Tour golfers
Ryder Cup competitors for Europe
Golf course architects
Sportspeople from Newcastle upon Tyne
1934 births
2013 deaths